Stanislav Koval (born 1 May 2002) is a professional Ukrainian football striker who plays for St. Louis City SC 2.

Career
Born in Uzhhorod, Koval is a product of the Youth Sportive School in his native city and competed for this team in the Ukrainian Youth Football League.

In July 2019 he joined the newly promoted Ukrainian Premier League side FC Kolos Kovalivka, but never made his debut for its, instead playing in the Ukrainian First League clubs on loan.

References

External links
Statistics at UAF website (Ukr)

2002 births
Living people
Sportspeople from Uzhhorod
Ukrainian footballers
FC Kolos Kovalivka players
FC Polissya Zhytomyr players
FC Podillya Khmelnytskyi players
Ukrainian First League players
MLS Next Pro players
Association football forwards